Are U Still Down: Jon B. Greatest Hits is the first compilation album by American R&B singer, Jon B. It was released on March 26, 2002 on Epic Records. It consists of previously released material from the singer's first three albums from 1995 to 2001.

Hit singles include "Are U Still Down" (ft. 2Pac), "Someone to Love", "They Don't Know", & "Don't Say".

Track listing
 "Someone to Love" (ft. Babyface) - 4:35
 "Pretty Girl" - 4:52
 "They Don't Know" - 4:34   
 "Are U Still Down" (ft. 2 Pac) - 4:27    
 "Don't Talk" - 4:43 
 "Cool Relax" - 4:26
 "Finer Things" (ft. Nas) - 5:02
 "Don't Say" - 4:48
 "Can We Get Down?" - 5:23
 "Time After Time" - 5:47
 "Pride & Joy" - 3:37
 "Now I'm With You" - 4:20 
 "All I Can Do" - 5:30
 "True Love" - 4:20

See also
 Bonafide (Jon B. album)
 Cool Relax
 Pleasures U Like

References

External links
 

2002 albums
Epic Records albums
Jon B. albums